The Belgian military ranks are the military insignia used by the Belgian Armed Forces.

Commissioned officer ranks
The rank insignia of commissioned officers.

Notes

Officer-cadets at the Royal Military Academy wear the ranks of Second Lieutenant (or Ensign at sea, 2nd class) with the insignia of the Academy above the rank insignia.
Cadet-Officers at the Royal Military Academy wear the ranks of Soldier during their first year, and Warrant officer (or 1st master chief) during their second and third year. Both with the insignia of the Academy above the rank insignia.
The ranks of Admiral and Air Force General were created in 2002.
The ranks of Lieutenant general and General of the Medical component were introduced in April 2021 alongside the new unified 'tactical' rank insignia.

Other ranks
The rank insignia of non-commissioned officers and enlisted personnel.

Notes

CSM is an appointment at the Company level for individuals with the rank of First Sergeant or higher. Its insignia is that of the normal rank with a small crown at the top.
RSM (/) is an appointment at the Corps level for individuals with the rank of Warrant Officer or higher, this is the most senior NCO in the corps. Its insignia is that of the normal rank with a big crown at the top.
Corps Corporal (/) is an appointment at the Corps level for individuals with the rank of 1st master corporal, its insignia is that of the 1st master corporal with a crown at the top.
The rank names relating to corporal and sergeant are replaced with "brigadier" and "/" in application to personnel of units whose traditions are related to or descend from horse units. These include the cavalry, artillery, and logistics units. Similarly, in the cavalry units, the lowest rank is named "/", they are addressed the title "/", a remnant of the aristocratic origins of horse mounted units; it was sought to remove these names in March 2013, retaining only the generic rank names.

Ranks at the Royal Military Academy 

Notes:
 Student-Officers attain the rank of Corporal, CCO after completing their military initiation phase ("MIP" ).
 Student-Officers attain the rank of Sergeant, CCO after the first winter camp when they complete the training at the 'individual' level and start their training at the 'team' and 'squad' level.
 Student-Officers take an oath after they receive their bachelor's degree and successfully complete their 'second native language' exam, thus becoming Officer-Students and attaining the rank of Lieutenant, CCO or branch equivalent.

Medical Component rank variations

References

External links
 

Belgium
Military of Belgium